Revesby, a suburb of local government area City of Canterbury-Bankstown, is located 22 kilometres south-west of the Sydney central business district, in the state of New South Wales, Australia, and is a part of the South-western Sydney region.

Revesby is mostly a residential suburb, which was developed as part of Sydney's post-war urban sprawl, and contains many modest freestanding bungalows built from asbestos cement sheeting (fibro). Revesby is bounded on the north by Canterbury Road and the suburbs of Bankstown and Condell Park, on the south by Revesby Heights and Picnic Point, on the Georges River, on the west by Panania, and on the east by Padstow.

History
Revesby was named in 1913 in honour of Sir Joseph Banks, the botanist who sailed with Captain James Cook on the Endeavour, when he reached the east coast of Australia in 1770. Banks had inherited his father's estate of Revesby Abbey, in Lincolnshire, England, so he was known as the Squire of Revesby. He is also commemorated in the Sir Joseph Banks High School in Turvey Street.

George Johnston, an officer of marines who had arrived on the First Fleet was granted land in this area in 1804. His wife Esther Julian, who had arrived as a convict on the same ship in 1788 was granted  on 1 November 1813. That part of Julian's 570 acres south of Milperra Road between The River Road and Queen Street down to Bransgrove Road, was subdivided in 1889 into 707 lots to land, each about a quarter of an acre. It was known as the Beaconsfield Estate. <Deposited Plan 2343>

The earliest landowners did not reside in the area. The only mansion built in the early days was 'The Pah' on Tompson Road. It was built in 1896-1897 by Samuel John Hales on  that had been purchased from the Weston estate. That property was subdivided in 1926 but the house remains.

The first school opened as Bankstown South in 1896; now known as Revesby Public School. The railway station opened on 21 December 1931. The local post office opened in 1955.

Population
According to the 2016 census of Population, there were 14,176 people in Revesby.
 58.2% of people were born in Australia. The next most common countries of birth were China 5.7%, Vietnam 4.7%, Lebanon 3.3%, India 2.5%, New Zealand 2.0% and Pakistan 1.0%.
 51.2% of people spoke only English at home. Other languages spoken at home included Arabic 10.0%, Vietnamese 6.4%, Mandarin 5.4%, Cantonese 4.1% and Greek 3.0%. 
 The most common responses for religion were Catholic 27.8%, No Religion 18.9%, Anglican 10.8% and Islam 8.1%.

Commercial area

Revesby has a growing retail shopping centre, adjacent to Revesby railway station, centred on Marco Avenue and Selems Parade. It is also the site of several local government facilities including a senior citizens centre.

The Revesby shopping village is home to many banks, specialty retailers, restaurants and cafés. In the early 2000s, one of the largest Woolworths supermarkets in Sydney was built in Marco Avenue, across the road from the existing complex. On the original site, a combined residential and retail development called Revesby Abbey was completed in 2003. These developments brought a major increase in shoppers and business to the area. Revesby Abbey is now a popular spot for people to meet as it features many cafes, restaurants and boutiques lining the street.

Culture and entertainment

A major attraction of Revesby is the Revesby Workers' Club. Originally opened in 1962, today it has over 50,000 members, with extensive modern facilities. The most recent upgrades were completed in 2000, with further extensions currently under construction expected to significantly change the club, making it one of the largest in the state. The recent addition of a multi-level car park as well as another supermarket in close proximity has greatly increased access for locals for entertainment and products.

An Arts and Crafts Fair is held every month at Abel Reserve.

Transport
Revesby railway station is on the Airport & South Line of the Sydney Trains network. During the morning and afternoon peak, express services run via Sydenham and Redfern.

Revesby is serviced by buses operated by Transdev NSW, generally following the routes established by McVicar's Bus Services.

Education
 Revesby Public School
 Revesby South Public School
 Sir Joseph Banks High School
 St Lukes Catholic Primary School
 Broderick Gillawarna special needs school
 De La Salle College

A campus of the Western Sydney University is in the neighbouring suburb of Milperra. Technical and Further Education (TAFE) courses are available at the nearby suburbs of Bankstown and Padstow.

Politics
For federal elections, Revesby is in the federal electoral division of Banks, held by David Coleman, of the Liberal Party of Australia. He has held it since the 2013 federal election. The seat was held continuously by Labor from proclamation in 1949 until the 2013 federal election.

For NSW state elections, Revesby is predominantly in the state electoral district of East Hills.  This seat is currently held by Wendy Lindsay.

Sport
 Revesby Workers Football Club is based at Marco Reserve
 Revesby Rover's Football Soccer Club Inc. is based at Amour Park
 St Christopher's Soccer Club is based at Marco Reserve
 St Christophers Junior Rugby League Club, part of the Canterbury-Bankstown District Junior Rugby League. It has produced such players as Brent Sherwin, Graeme Hughes, Corey Hughes, Jarrad Hickey and Mark Riddell.
 Revesby Skate Park
Max Parker Leisure & Aquatic Centre
Revesby Workers Cricket Club
 St Christophers Cricket Club
 Panania Cricket Club, it has produced players such as Steve Waugh and Mark Waugh

Notable residents
The following people live, or have lived, in Revesby.
Pat Clancy, trade union leader (1919–1987)
Eric Cox, rugby league administrator (1923–2006)
Lisa Jackson Pulver, epidemiologist (born 1959)
Johnny Raper, rugby league player 
Maurie Raper, rugby league player
Sean Russo, paralympian (born 1991)

References

City of Canterbury-Bankstown
Suburbs of Sydney